Generali Tower ("the Twisted One") is a skyscraper completed in 2017 in Milan, Italy that reaches a height of  with 44 floors (+ 3 floors basement), and a total floor area of about . Its designer is the Anglo-Iraqi architect Zaha Hadid, hence it is also called  ("Hadid Tower"). The geometry of the building is that of a warping shape, where both the floors dimension and their orientation vary along the tower axis.

The structure is concrete and composite. A central core acts as main horizontal stiffening and resisting element. Foundations are of mixed raft and piles type, where the piles are used as settlement reduction devices. The base raft is a  concrete slab, resting on 64 piles arranged in clusters and points under the main load points. In order to resist the main torsional effects due to the warped column arrangement, the core lintels above main doors feature composite solutions with a mixed use of steel elements, rebar and concrete. Due to the specific form-dependent deformation effects, a highly sophisticated stage analysis both for construction and long-term effects has been performed. A steel, free form podium for commercial use surrounds the base of the building.

In October 2019 the tower was awarded first place for excellence in the mid-rise category by the American Concrete Institute.

The building hosts offices of Assicurazioni Generali, the third largest insurance group in the world by revenue.

See also
 List of twisted buildings

References

Skyscrapers in Milan
Twisted buildings and structures
Skyscraper office buildings in Italy
Generali Group